LifeBank may refer to:

 LifeBank (Philippines), a microfinance institution and bank based in Iloilo City and Santa Barbara, Iloilo, Philippines
 LifeBank (Nigeria), a healthcare technology and logistics company based in Lagos, Nigeria